is a Japanese manga and anime series, with its concept created by Kazuhiro Fujita. The manga series, written and illustrated by Mitsuhisa Tamura, was published in Shogakukan's Weekly Shōnen Sunday from March 2006 to April 2007, with its chapters collected in five tankōbon volumes. In North America, Viz Media published it in English in 2009.

The 51-episode anime television series directed by Hiroshi Negishi and produced by Radix Ace Entertainment was broadcast in Japan on TV Tokyo from April 2006 to March 2007. It was the last series to be produced by the company right before it was defunct.

Plot
Sanshiro Tamon's chances of having an adventure are slim to none in his tiny island hometown, until the day a mysterious stranger named Fue invites him to play a game. Sanshiro is taken to a backwards universe to play BakéGyamon, a game pitting monsters against monsters. Along the way he meets other players who have a particular reason for being there; to obtain the wish that is granted to the winner.

Media

Manga
BakéGyamon concept was created by Kazuhiro Fujita and the manga was written and illustrated by Mitsuhisa Tamura. It was serialized in Shogakukan's Weekly Shōnen Sunday from March 15, 2006 to April 4, 2007. Shogakukan collected its chapters in five tankōbon volumes, released from June 16, 2006 to May 18, 2007.

In North America, the manga was licensed by Viz Media in 2008, and published it as BakéGyamon: Backwards Game. The five volumes were released from March 3 to December 1, 2009.

Chuang Yi published the manga in English in Singapore. In France Sakka published the manga.

Volume list

Anime
A 51-episode anime television series directed by Hiroshi Negishi and produced by Radix Ace Entertainment was broadcast in Japan on TV Tokyo from April 3, 2006 to March 26, 2007.

Video game
A Nintendo DS 3D fighting game was published by Takara Tomy on March 1, 2007 in Japan.

References

Further reading

External links
BakéGyamon official anime website at TV Tokyo 

2006 manga
Adventure anime and manga
Anime with original screenplays
Fantasy anime and manga
TV Tokyo original programming
Viz Media manga